Chal-e Siyah or Chal Siah may refer to:
 Chal Siah, Kermanshah Province
 Chal-e Siyah Gelal, Kohgiluyeh and Boyer-Ahmad Province
 Chal Siah Manchatun Jowkar, Kohgiluyeh and Boyer-Ahmad Province
 Chal Siah, Mazandaran

See also
 Chaleh Siah (disambiguation)